The Idoteidae are a family of isopod crustaceans. It includes these genera:

Austridotea Poore, 2001
Batedotea Poore & Lew Ton, 1993
Cleantiella Richardson, 1912
Colidotea Richardson, 1899
Crabyzos Bate, 1863
Edotia Guérin-Méneville, 1843
Engidotea Barnard, 1914
Erichsonella Benedict in Richardson, 1901
Euidotea Collinge, 1917
Eusymmerus Richardson, 1899
Glyptidotea Stebbing, 1902
Idotea Fabricius, 1798
Lyidotea Hale, 1929
Moplisa Moreira, 1974
Parasymmerus Brusca & Wallerstein, 1979
Paridotea Stebbing, 1900
Pentias Richardson, 1904
Pentidotea Richardson, 1905
Platidotea Park & Wägele, 1995
Stenosoma Leach, 1814
Synidotea Harger, 1878
Synischia Hale, 1924

References

Valvifera
Crustacean families
Taxa named by George Samouelle